Herman Zahorskyj (? - 1600 or 1601) was a bishop of the Ruthenian Uniate Church. Since 1595 he was Archbishop of Polotsk (originally Orthodox) and in 1596 accepted the Union of Brest, became Greek Catholic.

Biography

Zahorskyj was named as coadjutor on May 5, 1595, for the Archeparchy of Polotsk. Since July 1595 (after the death of the previous bishop of Polotsk Natanail Selitsky) he assumed the function of the ordinary of the Polotsk eparch. On September 22, 1595, the Polish king Sigismund III Vasa named him archbishopric of Polotsk. In 1594 - 1595, Hermann Zahorskyj signed Uniate documents as "nominated" to the archbishop of Polotsk.

On 19 October 1596 he was one of those Orthodox hierarchs who supported and signed the act of the Union of Brest, formally became a Greek Catholic bishop till his death in 1600 or 1601.

Literature

 T. Kempa: Prawosławie i unia we wschodnich województwach WKL w końcu XVII w. pp. 5–10.
 Блажейовський Д .: Ієрархія Київської церкви (861-1996). Львів: Каменяр, 1996. p. 281.

References

External links
 http://www.catholic-hierarchy.org/bishop/bzahor.html

1500s births
1600 deaths
People from Polotsk
Converts to Eastern Catholicism from Eastern Orthodoxy
Eastern Orthodox bishops in the Polish–Lithuanian Commonwealth
Former Belarusian Orthodox Christians
16th-century Eastern Orthodox bishops
Uniate archbishops of Polotsk